Franca Parisi (born 28 September 1933) is an Italian actress.

Biography 
Parisi graduated from the Centro Sperimentale di Cinematografia of Rome in 1955, and made her screen debut that same year in Raffaello Matarazzo's film The White Angel. She then acted in a number of films of the peplum or drama genre, sometimes under the pseudonym Margaret Taylor. In 1959, she married the Austrian actor Erwin Strahl.

In the '60s, Parisi came to television, where she starred in many television dramas : memorably, she played Jane in Anton Giulio Majano's The black arrow.

She retired to private life in the second half of the 1970s.

Selected filmography

Cinema 
 1954: The Shadow on the Hill
 1955: The White Angel
 1958: Scampolo
 1960: Atom Age Vampire
 1962: Julius Caesar Against the Pirates
 1962: The Old Testament
 1963: The Ten Gladiators

Television 

 1963: Ritorna il tenente Sheridan
 1965: Le avventure di Laura Storm

External links 
 https://www.imdb.com/name/nm0661715/
 https://www.bfi.org.uk/films-tv-people/4ce2ba250f0f5
 https://www.rottentomatoes.com/celebrity/franca_parisi_strahl
 https://www.filmweb.pl/person/Franca+Parisi-98083

References 

1933 births
Living people
Actresses from Palermo
20th-century Italian actresses